Comitato parlamentare per la sicurezza della Repubblica (Parliamentary Committee for the Security of the Republic) is a body of the Italian Parliament deputed to survey and oversee the activities of the Italian intelligence agencies.

History 
Since the end of World War II, Italian intelligence agencies have been reorganized many times in an attempt to increase their effectiveness and bring them more fully under civilian control.

The committee was established as part of a broader reform of the Italian intelligence community, which represented the latest in a long string of government attempts to effectively manage Italy's intelligence agencies.

 In 1977, with Legislative Act n.801 of 24/10/1977, this came after a former chief of SID, Vito Miceli, was arrested for "conspiration against the State" (See Golpe Borghese), and the intelligence agencies were reorganized in a democratic attempt. This re-organization mainly consisted of:
 The split of SID, the intelligence agency at that time, into two separate agencies with different roles: SISDE (the domestic one) and SISMI (the military one).
 The creation of CESIS, with a coordination role between the two intelligence agencies and the Presidency of the Council of Ministers.
 The creation of the Parliamentary Committee, COPACO, to oversee the activities of the two agencies.
 Since 1 August 2007, with Legislative Act n.124 of 08/03/2007, following the reform of the Italian intelligence agencies, SISDE, SISMI and CESIS were replaced respectively by AISI, AISE and DIS; the COPACO was renamed COPASIR (Comitato Parlamentare per la Sicurezza della Repubblica, Parliamentary Committee for the Security of the Republic) and granted additional oversight and control powers.

Mission 
Following the reform of the Italian intelligence agencies approved on 1 August 2007, COPASIR. has the power to:

 Declassify State Secrets, but only if all members of the Committee agree with unanimity.
 Acquire acts and dossiers from judicial investigations, with the authority to overcome the professional secrecy, both of judicial and banking nature.
 Have free access to intelligence agencies' offices and documentations.

COPASIR is constituted by four Senators and four Deputies, designated proportionally by the Presidents of the two Chambers (the Chamber of Deputies and the Senate of the Republic).

Current composition

List of presidents

References

External links 
The Italian Intelligence and Security Services Official Website - COPACO 
The Italian Intelligence and Security Services Official Website - Home Page 

Political committees of Italy
Parliamentary committees